Utaha, also known as Ifo, is an extinct language of the island Erromango in Vanuatu.

References

Languages of Vanuatu
South Vanuatu languages
Extinct languages of Oceania
Languages extinct in the 1950s